The  Denver Broncos season was the team's 34th year in professional football and its 24th with the National Football League.

1993 was the first year for new head coach Wade Phillips, who had been the team's defensive coordinator since 1989. John Elway was the quarterback for the Denver Broncos in which he passed for 4,030 yards. This team also had two hall of fame players in Shannon Sharpe and Steve Atwater. Their season finished in an AFC Wild Card Playoff loss against the Los Angeles Raiders by the score of 42-24.

Offseason
After the 1992 season, Broncos owner Pat Bowlen fired head coach Dan Reeves, who had helmed the franchise for 12 years. The team promoted defensive coordinator Wade Phillips—son of former Oilers and Saints coach Bum Phillips—to head coach.

NFL draft

Personnel

Staff

Roster

Regular season

Schedule

Season summary

Week 1

Standings

Postseason

AFC wild card game

Awards and records
John Elway, franchise record, most passing yards in one season, 4,030 Yards

Milestones

References

External links
Denver Broncos – 1993 media guide
 Broncos on Pro Football Reference
 Broncos Schedule on jt-sw.com

Denver Broncos
Denver Broncos seasons
Bronco